The men's 100 metres was of one of 23 track events of the athletics at the 2004 Summer Olympics, in Athens. It was contested at the Athens Olympic Stadium, from August 21 to 22, by a total of 82 sprinters from 62 nations. Each nation was limited to 3 athletes per rules in force since the 1930 Olympic Congress. 

The event was won by Justin Gatlin of the United States, the nation's second consecutive title and 16th overall in the event. Portugal earned its first medal in the men's 100 metres, with Francis Obikwelu's silver. The final was the fastest and most disputed in Olympic history, with six runners covering the distance in 10.00 seconds or less (four of them under the 9.90 mark), and the gold and bronze medalist athletes separated by 0.02 seconds.

The medals for the competition were presented by Juan Antonio Samaranch, IOC Hononary President for Life, Spain; and the medalists' bouquets were presented by Lamine Diack, IAAF President, Senegal.

Background

This was the twenty-fifth time the event was held, having appeared at every Olympics since the first in 1896. All three finalists from 2000 returned: defending gold medalist Maurice Greene of the United States, silver medalist Ato Boldon of Trinidad and Tobago, and bronze medalist Obadele Thompson of Barbados, along with three other finalists (Darren Campbell of Great Britain, Kim Collins of Saint Kitts and Nevis, and Aziz Zakari of Ghana). Two-time silver medalist (1992 and 1996) Frankie Fredericks of Namibia also returned after missing the Sydney Games with injury. 

Collins was the reigning (2003) world champion, as well as Commonwealth champion. Francis Obikwelu of Portugal had won the 2002 European Championship. On the United States team, along with an aging Greene (still a medal contender, but no longer as dominant as in 2000), was a young Justin Gatlin.

Aruba, Jordan, Kiribati, the Federated States of Micronesia, and Slovenia appeared in the event for the first time. The United States made its 24rd appearance in the event, most of any country, having missed only the boycotted 1980 Games.

Qualification

The Olympic qualification period for the athletics ran from 1 January 2003 to 9 August 2004. For this event, each National Olympic Committee (NOC) was permitted to enter up to three athletes, provided they had run below 10.21 seconds during this period in IAAF-sanctioned meetings or tournaments. If a NOC had no athletes qualified under this standard, it could enter up to one athlete that had run below 10.28 seconds.

Competition format

The event retained the same basic four round format introduced in 1920: heats, quarterfinals, semifinals, and a final. The "fastest loser" system, introduced in 1968, was used again to ensure that the quarterfinals and subsequent rounds had exactly 8 runners per heat; this time, the system was used in both the heats and quarterfinals.

The first round consisted of 10 heats, each with 8 or 9 athletes. The top three runners in each heat advanced, along with the next ten fastest runners overall. This made 40 quarterfinalists, who were divided into 5 heats of 8 runners. The top three runners in each quarterfinal advanced, with one "fastest loser" place. The 16 semifinalists competed in two heats of 8, with the top four in each semifinal advancing to the eight-man final.

Records
, the existing World and Olympic records were as follows.

No new records were set during the competition.

Schedule
All times are Eastern European Summer Time (UTC+3)

Results

Round 1

Qualification rule: The first three finishers in each heat (Q) plus the ten fastest times of those who finished fourth or lower in their heat (q) qualified.

Heat 1

Heat 2

Heat 3

Heat 4

Heat 5

Heat 6

Heat 7

Heat 8

Heat 9

Heat 10

Quarterfinals

Qualification rule: The first three finishers in each heat (Q) plus the next fastest overall sprinter (q) qualified.

Quarterfinal 1

Quarterfinal 2

Quarterfinal 3

Quarterfinal 4

Quarterfinal 5

Semifinals
Qualification rule: The first four runners in each semifinal heat (Q) moves on to the final.

Semifinal 1

Semifinal 2

Final

In the final, the slowest to react was Justin Gatlin, still with the most powerful first steps, Gatlin led from the gun, with Kim Collins, the next slowest to react, also getting a typically fast start (typically in lane 1). A step behind, back from injuries, defending champion Maurice Greene, was fastest to react but running sideways in quicksand. He was joined by Francis Obikwelu and Shawn Crawford, who had a slight edge on the other competitors in the center of the track.  Collins faded as Obikwelu, Crawford and Greene gained. Feeling his lead disappearing rapidly, Gatlin leaned early still maintaining the lead across the line. The tall Obikwelu perfectly timed his dip to clearly grab silver.  Crawford's finish occurred two meters too late giving Greene another medal with the same time as his win four years earlier.

References

External links
 IAAF Athens 2004 Olympic Coverage

M
100 metres at the Olympics
Men's events at the 2004 Summer Olympics